Windigo is a half-beast creature that appears in Algonquian mythology.

Windigo or Wendigo may also refer to:

Places

Canada
Windigo Lake (Ontario), a lake in Northern Ontario
Windigo River, Quebec, flows into the Saint-Maurice River
Rivière-Windigo, Quebec, a former unorganized territory that is now part of La Tuque, Quebec
Windigo, Quebec, located near the Rapides-des-Coeurs Generating Station

United States
Lake Windigo, a small lake on Star Island in  Minnesota
Windigo Lake, located in Sawyer County, Wisconsin
Windigo, Michigan, an unincorporated community
Windigo Ranger Station, a docking and refueling port on Isle Royale in Lake Superior

Other uses
Windigo First Nations Council, a non-political Chiefs Council in northwestern Ontario, Canada
 Wendigo (comics), a fictional character in the Marvel Comics universe
 Wendigo (film), a 2001 horror film
 "Wendigo" (Supernatural), an episode of the television series Supernatural
 "Wendigo", a song on the Sharon Needles album, Taxidermy
 Splake, a hybrid trout
 "The Wendigo" (novella), a 1910 horror novella by Algernon Blackwood

See also